"Are You Ready" is an R&B song written by Danny O'Donoghue and Ruth-Anne Cunningham, also known as the MadNotes production team (who have also done work for artists like Britney Spears and Justin Timberlake) and recorded by the Australian musical duo Shakaya. The song also features a rap verse from Nate Wade.

Produced by Mark Sheehan, Alex Greggs and Daniel O'Donoghue, "Are You Ready" was released as the lead single from Shakaya's second album of the same name on 13 June 2005. The song debuted at number 25 in Australia, stayed there for two weeks, and left the chart two weeks later.

Track listing
Australian CD single
 "Are You Ready" (featuring Nate Wade)
 "Say Ho"
 "Are You Ready" (without rap)

Charts

Anna Abreu version

In 2007, Finnish Idols runner-up Anna Abreu covered the song for her self-titled debut album. In January 2008, the song was confirmed to be the third single from the album, after "End of Love" and "Ivory Tower". The digital release followed on 22 January 2008. The official remix was digitally released a month after, on 25 February 2008.

Track listings
Digital release
 "Are You Ready" – 3:13

Remixes single
 "Are You Ready" (2008 Remix Radio Edit) – 3:22
 "Are You Ready" (2008 Remix Extended) – 4:12

References

2005 singles
2005 songs
Columbia Records singles
RCA Records singles
Shakaya songs
Songs written by Danny O'Donoghue
Songs written by RuthAnne
Sony BMG singles